The 2009 Bonnaroo Music and Arts Festival was held June 11–14, 2009 at a  farm in Manchester, Tennessee, United States. There were roughly 75,000 people in attendance. The onset of Bonnaroo 2009 was punctuated by monstrous thunderstorms. Thursday night included heavy rain, lightning, strong winds and hail. A lighter storm passed over the farm on Friday. The resulting mud became a hardship for some and a plaything for others.

Lineup
The initial lineup was released on the festival's website at midnight on February 3, 2009. Phish performed a traditional 2-set headlining spot on Sunday night as well as a late night set on Friday night.  Bruce Springsteen & The E Street Band performed Saturday.

Down and The Ting Tings appeared on the initial lineup but were later removed.

The previously annual Superjam did not take place, and for the first time in Bonnaroo's eight-year history, not a single The Grateful Dead member performed at the festival.

June 11th

(artists listed from earliest to latest set times)

This Tent:
Erick Baker
White Rabbits
Hockey
Chairlift
Passion Pit
Delta Spirit
That Tent:
Charlie Allen
Alberta Cross
Portugal. The Man
The Low Anthem
Zac Brown Band
The Other Tent:
Janelle Monáe
Murs
The Knux
People Under The Stairs
Midnite
Comedy Sweet Humored by Butterfinger:
Comedy Carnivale: Christian Finnegan, Arj Barker, Janeane Garofalo, Nick Thune & Pete Holmes (3 Sets)
Bonnapoo 2009 Starring Triumph the Insult Comic Dog
Cinema Tent:
Chuck Norris Rules: Missing in Action
Kids Play
Primus: Blame It on the Fish
The Present
Green Screens presented by Rock the Earth: Mountaintop Removal Q&A: Ben Sollee/Maria Gumoe
2009 NBA Finals Game Four
Teen Wolf
House Party
Chuck Norris Rules: Lone Wolf McQuade
The Simpsons Movie
Arcade Discothèque Powered by Xbox 360:
Tobacco
DJ Quickie Mart
Gypsyphonic Disko (DJ Set by Ben Ellman of Galactic)
Kraak & Smaak
Troo Music Lounge Hosted by Budweiser:
Jedd Hughes
Roger Alan Wade
Julia Nunes
The Black Lillies
Erin McCarley
Those Darlins
Tanglers Blues Band
American Princes
Tobacco
Solar Stage:
Hunub Kru Breakdancing
Poetix
Bonnaroo Buskers
Now The River: Eco-Folk Music
African Drum and Dance By Mawre Company
Gypsy Hands Tribal Dance
Bonnaroo Buskers
Yoga Out of Bounds
Hunab Kru Breakdancing
Stephen Smartt & Brian Pierce
Poetix
Ogya
Bonnaroo Buskers
Hunub Kru Breakdancing
Gypsy Hands Tribal Dance
Silent Disco Powered by Vitaminwater Sync:
J. Boogie (including Latin Funk Dance Hour)
Aaron LaCrate
The Hood Internet
Motion Potion

June 12th

(artists listed from earliest to latest set times)

What Stage:
The Itals
Galactic with Trombone Shorty and Corey Henry
Al Green
Beastie Boys
Phish
Which Stage:
Gomez
Animal Collective
Yeah Yeah Yeahs
TV on the Radio
David Byrne
This Tent:
Tift Merritt
Kaki King
Grace Potter and the Nocturnals
Grizzly Bear
Lucinda Williams
Public Enemy
Paul Oakenfold
That Tent:
Katzenjammer
Dirty Projectors
St. Vincent
Santigold
Ani DiFranco
Phoenix
Crystal Castles
Girl Talk
The Other Tent:
Toubab Krewe
Vieux Farka Touré
Béla Fleck & Toumani Diabaté
King Sunny Adé & the African Beats
Amadou & Mariam
Femi Kuti and the Positive Force
Pretty Lights
Sonic Stage:
Portugal. The Man
Alberta Cross
The Low Anthem
Patterson Hood & The Screwtopians
moe.
Kaki King
Galactic (Interview Only)
Béla Fleck & Toumani Diabaté
Toubab Krewe
Comedy Sweet Humored by Butterfinger:
Comedy Carnivale: Christian Finnegan, Arj Barker, Janeane Garofalo, Nick Thune & Pete Holmes (3 Sets)
Bonnapoo 2009 Starring Triumph the Insult Comic Dog (2 Sets)
Cafe Where Hosted by AT&T:
The Belleville Outfit
Ben Sollee
Mt. St. Helens Vietnam Band
Cinema Tent:
Cold Souls
Q&A: Don Hertzfeldt
Green Screens presented by Rock the Earth: Flow Q&A: Gill Holland/Intro: Adam Yauch
Anvil! The Story of Anvil
Happiness Is
Chuck Norris Rules: Missing in Action
Tropic Thunder
The Dark Knight
Arcade Discothèque Powered by Xbox 360:
The Hood Internet
Aaron LaCrate
Troo Music Lounge Hosted by Budweiser:
Moonalice
Everest
Evan Watson
Dirty Sweet
The Features
Jets Overhead
Justin Townes Earle
The Protomen
Ki Theory
Solar Stage:
Gypsy Hands Tribal Dance
Rock The Earth Panel Discussion: "Social Change Through Music"
Poetix
African Drum and Dance by Mawre Company
Rock The Earth Interview and Performance
Bonnaroo Buskers
Justin Townes Earle
Poetix
Cotton Jones
African Drum and Dance by Mawre Company
Bonnaroo Buskers
Hunab Kru Breakdancing
Gypsy Hands Tribal Dance
Silent Disco Powered by Vitaminwater Sync:
Motion Potion (including 70's Funk Hour)
J. Boogie's 80's Dance Party
Gypsyphonic Disko
Kraak & Smaak

June 13th

(artists listed from earliest to latest set times)

What Stage:
Wailing Souls
Rodrigo y Gabriela
Wilco
Bruce Springsteen and the E Street Band
Which Stage:
Ilo & the Coral Reefer All Stars featuring Jimmy Buffett
Heartless Bastards
Booker T & The DBT's
Gov't Mule
The Mars Volta
Nine Inch Nails
This Tent:
Elvis Perkins in Dearland
Robyn Hitchcock & The Venus 3
Bon Iver
of Montreal
The Decemberists
moe.
That Tent:
Alejandro Escovedo
Allen Toussaint
Raphael Saadiq
Jenny Lewis
Elvis Costello Solo
Yeasayer
MGMT
The Other Tent:
The SteelDrivers
Cherryholmes
Tony Rice Unit
The Del McCoury Band
David Grisman Quintet
Ben Harper and Relentless7
Sonic Stage:
Chairlift
Katzenjammer
Grace Potter and the Nocturnals
Brett Dennen
Heartless Bastards
Allen Toussaint
Cherryholmes
Raphael Saadiq
Tony Rice Unit
Travelin' McCourys
Comedy Sweet Humored by Butterfinger:
Bonnapoo 2009 Starring Triumph the Insult Comic Dog
Daily Show Stars: John Oliver, Rob Riggle, Rory Albanese, Wyatt Cenac, Kristen Schaal, Kurt Braunohler
Jimmy Fallon with Wayne Federman (2 Sets)
Daily Show Stars
Cafe Where Hosted by AT&T:
William Elliott Whitmore
Zee Avi
Cotton Jones
Cinema Tent:
Beautiful Losers
Lebowski Fest - Movie Party
Green Screens presented by Rock the Earth: Grand Canyon Adventure
Q&A: Don Hertzfeldt
Polanskied:
Chinatown
Rosemary's Baby
The Tenant
Cold Souls
Arcade Discothèque Powered by Xbox 360:
Kraak & Smaak
Aaron LaCrate
Troo Music Lounge Hosted by Budweiser:
Turbine
Fiction Family
Joe Pug
Dan Dyer
BrakesBrakesBrakes
Jerry Hannan
Russian Circles
The Giraffes
Kuroma
Solar Stage:
African Drum and Dance by Mawre Company
Rock The Earth Panel Discussion: "Social Change Through Music"
Poetix
Rock The Earth Interview and Performance
Rock The Earth Interview and Performance: Ben Sollee
Bonnaroo Buskers
Gypsy Hands Tribal Dance
Julia Nunes
Poetix
The Black Lillies
Bonnaroo Buskers
African Drum and Dance by Mawre Company
Poetix
Hunab Kru Breakdancing
Gypsy Hands Tribal Dance
Silent Disco Powered by Vitaminwater Sync:
DJ Quickie Mart (featuring Old School Hip Hop Hour)
The Hood Internet
J. Boogie (featuring 80's Dance Party)

June 14th

(artists listed from earliest to latest set times)

What Stage:
The 6th Ward Treme Allstars Brass Band
Erykah Badu
Snoop Dogg
Phish
Which Stage:
Mike Farris and the Roseland Rhythm Revue
Citizen Cope
Andrew Bird
Band of Horses
This Tent:
The Lovell Sisters
Todd Snider
Robert Earl Keen
Merle Haggard
Neko Case
That Tent:
Cage the Elephant
The Dillinger Escape Plan
High on Fire
Shadows Fall
Coheed & Cambria
The Other Tent:
A.A. Bondy
Ted Leo and the Pharmacists
Brett Dennen
Okkervil River
Sonic Stage:
Ben Sollee
American Princes
Erin McCarley
Elvis Perkins
Julia Nunes
The Lovell Sisters
Ted Leo
A.A. Bondy
Mike Farris
The Nikhil Korula Band
Comedy Sweet Humored by Butterfinger:
Daily Show Stars: John Oliver, Rob Riggle, Rory Albanese, Wyatt Cenac, Kristen Schaal, Kurt Braunohler (2 Sets)
Michael & Michael Have Issues (2 Sets)
Cafe Where Hosted by AT&T:
Jessica Lea Mayfield
Outernational
The Heavy Pets
Cinema Tent:
Green Screens presented by Rock the Earth: Earth Days Q&A: Robert Stone
Lewbowski Fest - Movie Party
Kids Play
2009 NBA Finals Game Five
Troo Music Lounge Hosted by Budweiser:
Sons of Bill
Mynameisjohnmichael
The Nikhil Korula Band
Madi Diaz
Dear and the Headlights
Dirty Guv'nahs
Vertigo
Solar Stage:
Gypsy Hands Tribal Dance
Rock The Earth Panel Discussion: "Social Change Through Music"
Poetix
Rock The Earth Interview and Performance: Grace Potter and the Nocturnals
Rock The Earth Interview and Performance
Rock The Earth Interview and Performance: Brett Dennen
Hunab Kru Breakdancing
Gypsy Hands Tribal Dance
Bonnaroo Buskers
Silent Disco Powered by Vitaminwater Sync:
Motion Potion
DJ Quickie Mart (featuring 80's Hip Hop/Soul Mashup Hour)

References

Bonnaroo Music Festival by year
2009 in American music
2009 music festivals
Bonnaroo
2009 in Tennessee